The EF 200mm USM lens is an L-series prime telephoto lens made by Canon Inc. for the EOS line of cameras. Four 200 mm primes were made: 1.8, two 2.8, and the most recent 2.0.

The 200 mm 1.8 USM lens, introduced in November 1988, is the fastest 200 mm ever produced. It is a large off-white lens with rear drop-in filter tray. Production was discontinued in 2004. Its total production run was 8,000 with serial numbers from 11,000 to 17,999 inclusive. (Math or data error).  It featured an unusual "focus by wire" system where the focus ring drove the motor when focusing in manual mode. This functionality was shared with only one other lens, the 1200 mm 5.6 USM lens from Canon. The lens was used in the SuperWASP extrasolar planet search.

The 200 mm 2.0, introduced in April 2008, comes as a successor for the above discontinued 200 mm 1.8. It is a large off-white lens with a rear drop-in filter tray and Image Stabilization.

The 200 mm 2.8 lens is an inexpensive long prime. The first model, introduced in December 1991, had a built-in hood. It was discontinued in March 1996. It was superseded by the 'mark II', which is similar to first model but with standard bayonet hood, and is still in production. These lenses are Canon's second least expensive L-series lens behind the Canon EF 70-200mm lens 4.0 zoom L-series lens. It exceeds the Canon EF 70–200 mm lens 2.8 I in optical quality by a slight margin, but has since been overtaken by the Canon EF 70–200 mm lens 2.8 II. In comparison, it is significantly cheaper, lighter, and less conspicuous, but at the expense of the ability to zoom. There is no Image stabilizer. It sports a ring USM allowing full-time manual focusing. It is Canon's longest L-Series lens that is painted black.

All the aforementioned lenses are compatible with the Canon Extender EF teleconverters.

Crop factor 
When used with a Canon APS-C (1.6× crop) DSLR camera or APS-H (1.3× crop), the field of view of this lens is similar to a 320 mm or 260 mm on full frame camera.

Specifications of the EF 200 mm lenses

See also
 Canon L lens
 Canon EF lens mount

References

External links

 Canon EF 200mm f/2.8L II USM
 Example photos taken by the Canon Lens EF 200mm f/2L IS USM

Canon Camera Museum:
 f/1.8 version
 f/2.8 first edition
 f/2.8 second edition

24-105
Canon L-Series lenses